Archidendron oblongum is a species of legume in the family Fabaceae. It is found only in Solomon Islands.

References

oblongum
Flora of the Solomon Islands (archipelago)
Vulnerable plants
Endemic flora of the Solomon Islands
Taxonomy articles created by Polbot